Cnaphalocrocis similis is a moth in the family Crambidae. It is found on the U.S. Virgin Islands.

References

Spilomelinae
Moths described in 1894